The 69th Golden Globe Awards, honoring the best in film and television of 2011, were broadcast live from the Beverly Hilton Hotel in Beverly Hills, California on January 15, 2012, by NBC. The host was Ricky Gervais, for the third consecutive year. The musical theme for the year was composed by Yoshiki, leader of the Japanese band X Japan. The nominations were announced by Woody Harrelson, Sofía Vergara, Gerard Butler and Rashida Jones on December 15, 2011. Multiple winners for the night included the silent film The Artist which won three awards and The Descendants winning two awards. Freshman television series Homeland also won two awards.

Winners and nominees

These are the nominees for the 69th Golden Globe Awards. Winners are listed at the top of each list.

Film

Television

Multiple nominations

Films 
The following 15 films received multiple nominations:

Television
The following 15 series received multiple nominations:

Multiple wins

Film
The following 2 films received multiple wins:

Television 
The following series received multiple wins:

Ceremony

Presenters 

 Jessica Alba
 Antonio Banderas
 Kate Beckinsale
 Jessica Biel
 Emily Blunt
 Gerard Butler
 George Clooney
 Bradley Cooper
 Meltem Cumbul
 Johnny Depp
 Robert Downey, Jr.
 Jimmy Fallon
 Colin Firth
 Jane Fonda
 Harrison Ford
 Sarah Michelle Gellar
 Jake Gyllenhaal
 Salma Hayek
 Dustin Hoffman
 Felicity Huffman
 Jeremy Irons
 Angelina Jolie
 Nicole Kidman
 Mila Kunis
 Ashton Kutcher
 Queen Latifah
 Adam Levine
 Rob Lowe
 Jane Lynch
 Elle Macpherson
 William H. Macy
 Madonna
 Melissa McCarthy
 Ewan McGregor
 Katharine McPhee
 Debra Messing
 Helen Mirren
 Julianne Moore
 Clive Owen
 Paula Patton
 Piper Perabo
 Michelle Pfeiffer
 Freida Pinto
 Brad Pitt
 Sidney Poitier
 Natalie Portman
 Seth Rogen
 Channing Tatum
 Mark Wahlberg
 Reese Witherspoon

Cecil B. DeMille Award 
Morgan Freeman

Miss Golden Globe 
Rainey Qualley (daughter of Andie MacDowell & Paul Qualley)

See also
 Hollywood Foreign Press Association
 84th Academy Awards
 64th Primetime Emmy Awards
 63rd Primetime Emmy Awards
 18th Screen Actors Guild Awards
 65th British Academy Film Awards
 1st AACTA International Awards
 32nd Golden Raspberry Awards
 66th Tony Awards
 2011 in film
 2011 in American television
 79th

References

External links
 
 

069
2011 film awards
2011 television awards
Golden Globe
January 2012 events in the United States